Karagöl (literally 'black lake' in Turkish) may refer to the following entities in Turkey:

 Karagöl (Giresun), a region, mountain and lake in north-central Turkey
 Karagöl (Toros), a lake in south-central Turkey
 Karagöl (Izmir), a national park and lake in western Turkiye
 Karagöl-Sahara, a national park in Artvin Province, north-eastern Turkey
 Karagöl, Mardin, a village in Mardin Province, south-eastern Turkey
 MV Karagöl, an oil/chemical tanker owned and operated by a Turkish company